Ian Frederick Osborne (born 6 May 1951) is a former Australian politician.

He was born in Subiaco and was South West Director of Tourism before entering politics. In 1993 he was elected to the Western Australian Legislative Assembly as the Liberal member for Bunbury. From 1997 to 1999 he was Government Whip, and was the Deputy Chairman of Committees from 1996 to 2001, and he was Acting Speaker from 1999 to 2001, and he was Parliamentary Secretary to the Cabinet from 1999 to 2001, when he was defeated.

References

1951 births
Living people
Liberal Party of Australia members of the Parliament of Western Australia
Members of the Western Australian Legislative Assembly
21st-century Australian politicians